This list of 2012 motorsport champions is a list of national or international auto racing series with championships decided by the points or positions earned by a driver from multiple races where the season was completed during the 2012 calendar year.

Open wheel racing

Sports car and GT

Stock car racing

Touring car racing

Rallying

See also
 List of motorsport championships

References

 Champions
2012